The 2009–10 Illinois State Redbirds men's basketball team represented Illinois State University during the 2009–10 NCAA Division I men's basketball season. The Redbirds, led by third year head coach Tim Jankovich, played their home games at Doug Collins Court at Redbird Arena and were a member of the Missouri Valley Conference.

The Redbirds finished the season 22–11, 11–7 in conference play to finish in third place. They were the number three seed for the Missouri Valley Conference tournament. They won their quarterfinal game versus Indiana State University but lost their semifinal game versus Wichita State University.

The Redbirds received an at-large bid to the 2010 National Invitation Tournament and were assigned the number six seed in the University of Illinois regional. They were defeated by the University of Dayton in the first round.

Roster

Schedule

|-
!colspan=9 style=|Exhibition

|-
!colspan=9 style=|Regular Season

|-
!colspan=9 style=|Missouri Valley tournament

|-
!colspan=9 style=|NIT

References

Illinois State Redbirds men's basketball seasons
Illinois State
Illinois State